Counting argument may refer to:
Pigeonhole principle
Combinatorial proof